Gare de Lyon may refer to one of several railway stations in France:

In Paris
The Gare de Lyon, a seamless complex composed of:
Paris-Gare de Lyon, one of the six Parisian mainline railway stations
Gare de Lyon (Paris Métro), a Métro and RER station serving the railway station

In Lyon
Gare de Lyon-Part-Dieu, the mainline railway station in the 3rd arrondissement of Lyon
Gare de Lyon-Perrache, a station in the 2nd arrondissement of Lyon
 Gare de Lyon Saint-Exupéry, a mainline station near Lyon, France, directly attached to Lyon-Saint Exupéry Airport
 Gare de Lyon-Gorge-de-Loup, a railway station in the 9th arrondissement of Lyon
 Gare de Lyon-Jean Macé, a railway station in the 7th arrondissement of Lyon
 Gare de Lyon-Saint-Paul, a railway station in the 5th arrondissement of Lyon
 Gare de Lyon-Vaise, a railway station in the 9th arrondissement of Lyon
 Gare des Brotteaux, a former railway station in the 6th arrondissement of Lyon
 Gare de Lyon-Saint-Clair
 Gare de Lyon-Est

See also
 Gare (disambiguation)